Henry William Montagu(e) Paulet, 16th Marquess of Winchester (30 October 1862 – 28 June 1962) was an English peer, landowner, soldier, sportsman, politician and business man. He was known as Lord Henry Paulet from 1887 until 1899.

After a youth spent largely in travelling and hunting, he became Lord Lieutenant of Hampshire and Chairman of Hampshire County Council, then served in the Hampshire Regiment and the Rifle Brigade during the First World War. In the 1920s he was associated in business with Clarence Hatry, which led to his bankruptcy in 1930. When he died in Monte Carlo at the age of 99 he was the oldest-ever member of the House of Lords.

Early life
The younger son of the 14th Marquess by his marriage to Mary Montagu, a daughter of Henry Montagu, 6th Baron Rokeby, he was educated at Burney's Royal Naval Academy, Gosport, before travelling widely, hunting big game in the Rocky Mountains and visiting India, Ceylon, China and Japan. In 1891 he went to South Africa, where he became a friend and hunting companion of Cecil Rhodes.

Peerage
Paulet inherited the family titles and estates in 1899 on the death of his older brother, the 15th Marquess, who was killed in action at the Battle of Magersfontein.

As Paulet had no children, after his death in 1962, the title passed to Richard Charles Paulet (1905-1968), his first cousin twice removed through Charles Paulet, 13th Marquess of Winchester.  His stake in the family's settled land was probated at  plus a fraction of that including other assets in three grants in 1963.

Career
He was Lord Lieutenant of Hampshire and Custos Rotulorum from 1904 to 1917, Chairman of Hampshire County Council from 1904 to 1909, and President of the Territorial Association from 1909 to 1917.

Lord Winchester was commissioned a second lieutenant in the Yeomanry regiment Hampshire Carabiniers on 16 January 1901, and was promoted to captain on 6 December 1902. During the First World War, Winchester was re-commissioned as a Lieutenant into the 3rd Battalion of the Hampshire Regiment and was later a captain in the Hampshire Carabiniers and a Major in the 13th Rifle Brigade. He served in the British Expeditionary Force in France from 1915 to 1917.

During the 1920s, he entered the world of business in association with Clarence Hatry and became a director of several of Hatry's companies. On 20 September 1929 the London Stock Exchange suspended all shares of the Hatry group, and Hatry confessed to fraud and forgery. Nine days later, the Wall Street Crash began. In April 1930, in the High Court, a firm of stockbrokers succeeded in making Winchester personally liable to pay them £2,996, plus their legal costs, in connection with shares he had bought "on behalf of Austin Friars Trust", a Hatry company. However, in finding for the plaintiffs, the judge, Mr Justice Hawke, described Winchester as a "person of honesty and integrity" who was doubtless speaking what he believed to be the truth. On 8 November 1930, Winchester was declared bankrupt, and subsequently spent most of the rest of his life abroad. In 1932 he was discharged from bankruptcy. He was joint managing director of the City of London Electric Lighting Company from 1915-28.

In England he had lived at Amport House near Andover, and at 1, Portland Place, Westminster. During the Second World War Amport House was taken over by RAF Maintenance Command. Winchester died in Monte Carlo on 28 June 1962 at the age of ninety-nine. For more than a year he had been the oldest ever member of the House of Lords, having surpassed the record previously held by Hardinge Giffard, 1st Earl of Halsbury (1823–1921).

Personal life
In 1892 Lord Henry Paulet married Charlotte Howard, a daughter of Colonel Howard of Ballina Park, County Wicklow, and the widow of Samuel Garnett of Arch Hall, County Meath. After her death in 1924, and by now the Marquess of Winchester, he married Caroline, the widow of Major Claud Marks of the Highland Light Infantry; she died in 1949 and in 1952 he married Bapsy Pavry MA, a daughter of the Most Rev. Khurshedji Pavry, High Priest in India of the Parsees. He had no surviving children.

References

1862 births
1962 deaths
Royal Hampshire Regiment officers
Hampshire Yeomanry officers
Lord-Lieutenants of Hampshire
Henry
16
English expatriates in Monaco